David Robert Jones (8 January 194710 January 2016), known professionally as David Bowie, was an English singer-songwriter and actor. A leading figure in the music industry, he is regarded as one of the most influential musicians of the 20th century. Bowie was acclaimed by critics and musicians, particularly for his innovative work during the 1970s. His career was marked by reinvention and visual presentation, and his music and stagecraft had a significant impact on popular music.

Bowie developed an interest in music from an early age. He studied art, music and design before embarking on a professional career as a musician in 1963. "Space Oddity", released in 1969, was his first top-five entry on the UK Singles Chart. After a period of experimentation, he re-emerged in 1972 during the glam rock era with his flamboyant and androgynous alter ego Ziggy Stardust. The character was spearheaded by the success of Bowie's single "Starman" and album The Rise and Fall of Ziggy Stardust and the Spiders from Mars, which won him widespread popularity. In 1975, Bowie's style shifted towards a sound he characterised as "plastic soul", initially alienating many of his UK fans but garnering him his first major US crossover success with the number-one single "Fame" and the album Young Americans. In 1976, Bowie starred in the cult film The Man Who Fell to Earth and released Station to Station. In 1977, he again changed direction with the electronic-inflected album Low, the first of three collaborations with Brian Eno that came to be known as the "Berlin Trilogy". "Heroes" (1977) and Lodger (1979) followed; each album reached the UK top five and received lasting critical praise.

After uneven commercial success in the late 1970s, Bowie had three number-one hits: the 1980 single "Ashes to Ashes", its album Scary Monsters (and Super Creeps), and "Under Pressure" (a 1981 collaboration with Queen). He achieved his greatest commercial success in the 1980s with Let's Dance (1983). Between 1988 and 1992, he fronted the hard rock band Tin Machine before resuming his solo career in 1993. Throughout the 1990s and 2000s, Bowie continued to experiment with musical styles, including industrial and jungle. He also continued acting; his roles included Major Jack Celliers in Merry Christmas, Mr. Lawrence (1983), Jareth the Goblin King in Labyrinth (1986), Pontius Pilate in The Last Temptation of Christ (1988), and Nikola Tesla in The Prestige (2006), among other film and television appearances and cameos. He stopped touring after 2004 and his last live performance was at a charity event in 2006. In 2013, Bowie returned from a decade-long recording hiatus with The Next Day. He remained musically active until his death from liver cancer at his home in New York City. He died two days after both his 69th birthday and the release of his final album, Blackstar (2016).

During his lifetime, his record sales, estimated at over 100 million records worldwide, made him one of the best-selling musicians of all time. In the UK, he was awarded ten platinum, eleven gold and eight silver album certifications, and released 11 number-one albums. In the US, he received five platinum and nine gold certifications. He was inducted into the Rock and Roll Hall of Fame in 1996. Rolling Stone ranked him among the greatest artists in history. As of 2022, Bowie was the best-selling vinyl artist of the 21st century.

Early life
David Bowie was born David Robert Jones on 8 January 1947 in Brixton, London. His mother, Margaret Mary "Peggy" (née Burns; 2 October 1913 – 2 April 2001), was born at Shorncliffe Army Camp near Cheriton, Kent. Her paternal grandparents were Irish immigrants who had settled in Manchester. She worked as a waitress at a cinema in Royal Tunbridge Wells. His father, Haywood Stenton "John" Jones (21 November 1912 – 5 August 1969), was from Doncaster, Yorkshire, and worked as a promotions officer for the children's charity Barnardo's. The family lived at 40 Stansfield Road, on the boundary between Brixton and Stockwell in the south London borough of Lambeth. Bowie attended Stockwell Infants School until he was six years old, acquiring a reputation as a gifted and single-minded child—and a defiant brawler.

From 1953 Bowie moved with his family to Bickley and then Bromley Common, before settling in Sundridge Park in 1955 where he attended Burnt Ash Junior School. His voice was considered "adequate" by the school choir, and he demonstrated above-average abilities in playing the recorder. At the age of nine, his dancing during the newly introduced music and movement classes was strikingly imaginative: teachers called his interpretations "vividly artistic" and his poise "astonishing" for a child. The same year, his interest in music was further stimulated when his father brought home a collection of American 45s by artists including the Teenagers, the Platters, Fats Domino, Elvis Presley (who shared Bowie's birthday), and Little Richard. Upon listening to Little Richard's song "Tutti Frutti", Bowie would later say that he had "heard God".

Bowie was first impressed with Presley when he saw his cousin Kristina dance to "Hound Dog" soon after it was released in 1956. According to Kristina, she and David "danced like possessed elves" to records of various artists. By the end of the following year, Bowie had taken up the ukulele and tea-chest bass, begun to participate in skiffle sessions with friends, and had started to play the piano; meanwhile, his stage presentation of numbers by both Presley and Chuck Berry—complete with gyrations in tribute to the original artists—to his local Wolf Cub group was described as "mesmerizing ... like someone from another planet". Having encouraged his son to follow his dreams of being an entertainer since he was a toddler, in the late 1950s David's father took him to meet singers and other performers preparing for the Royal Variety Performance, introducing him to Alma Cogan and Tommy Steele. After taking his eleven-plus exam at the conclusion of his Burnt Ash Junior education, Bowie went to Bromley Technical High School. It was an unusual technical school, as biographer Christopher Sandford wrote:

Bowie's maternal half-brother, Terry Burns, was a substantial influence on his early life. Burns, who was 10 years older than Bowie, had schizophrenia and seizures, and lived alternately at home and in psychiatric wards; while living with Bowie, he introduced the younger man to many of his lifelong influences, such as modern jazz, Buddhism, Beat poetry, and the occult. In addition to Burns, a significant proportion of Bowie's extended family members had schizophrenia spectrum disorders, including an aunt who was institutionalised and another who underwent a lobotomy; this has been labelled as an influence on his early work.

Bowie studied art, music, and design, including layout and typesetting. After Burns introduced him to modern jazz, his enthusiasm for players like Charles Mingus and John Coltrane led his mother to give him a Grafton saxophone in 1961. He was soon receiving lessons from baritone saxophonist Ronnie Ross.

He received a serious injury at school in 1962 when his friend George Underwood punched him in the left eye during a fight over a girl. After a series of operations during a four-month hospitalisation, his doctors determined that the damage could not be fully repaired and Bowie was left with faulty depth perception and anisocoria (a permanently dilated pupil), which gave a false impression of a change in the iris' colour, erroneously suggesting he had heterochromia iridum (one iris a different colour to the other); his eye later became one of Bowie's most recognisable features. Despite their altercation, Bowie remained on good terms with Underwood, who went on to create the artwork for Bowie's early albums.

Music career

1962–1967: Early career to debut album

Bowie formed his first band, the Konrads, in 1962 at the age of 15. Playing guitar-based rock and roll at local youth gatherings and weddings, the Konrads had a varying line-up of between four and eight members, Underwood among them. When Bowie left the technical school the following year, he informed his parents of his intention to become a pop star. His mother arranged his employment as an electrician's mate. Frustrated by his bandmates' limited aspirations, Bowie left the Konrads and joined another band, the King Bees. He wrote to the newly successful washing-machine entrepreneur John Bloom inviting him to "do for us what Brian Epstein has done for the Beatles—and make another million." Bloom did not respond to the offer, but his referral to Dick James's partner Leslie Conn led to Bowie's first personal management contract.

Conn quickly began to promote Bowie. His debut single, "Liza Jane", credited to Davie Jones with the King Bees, was not commercially successful. Dissatisfied with the King Bees and their repertoire of Howlin' Wolf and Willie Dixon covers, Bowie quit the band less than a month later to join the Manish Boys, another blues outfit, who incorporated folk and soul—"I used to dream of being their Mick Jagger", Bowie was to recall. Their cover of Bobby Bland's "I Pity the Fool" was no more successful than "Liza Jane", and Bowie soon moved on again to join the Lower Third, a blues trio strongly influenced by the Who. "You've Got a Habit of Leaving" fared no better, signalling the end of Conn's contract. Declaring that he would exit the pop music world "to study mime at Sadler's Wells", Bowie nevertheless remained with the Lower Third. His new manager, Ralph Horton, later instrumental in his transition to solo artist, helped secure him a contract with Pye Records. Publicist Tony Hatch signed Bowie on the basis that he wrote his own songs. Dissatisfied with Davy (and Davie) Jones, which in the mid-1960s invited confusion with Davy Jones of the Monkees, he took on the stage name David Bowie after the 19th-century American pioneer James Bowie and the knife he had popularised. His first release under the name was the January 1966 single "Can't Help Thinking About Me", recorded with the Lower Third. The single flopped like its predecessors.

After the single's release, Bowie departed the Lower Third, partly due to Horton's influence, and released two more singles for Pye, "Do Anything You Say" and "I Dig Everything", both of which featured a new band called the Buzz, before signing with Deram Records. Around this time Bowie also joined the Riot Squad; their recordings, which included one of Bowie's original songs and material by the Velvet Underground, went unreleased. Kenneth Pitt, introduced by Horton, took over as Bowie's manager. His April 1967 solo single, "The Laughing Gnome", on which speeded-up and thus high-pitched vocals were used to portray the gnome in the song, failed to chart. Released six weeks later, his album debut, David Bowie, an amalgam of pop, psychedelia and music hall, met the same fate. It was his last release for two years. In September, Bowie recorded "Let Me Sleep Beside You" and "Karma Man", which were rejected by Deram for release as a single and left unreleased until 1970. Both tracks marked the beginning of Bowie's working relationship with producer Tony Visconti which, with large gaps, would last for the rest of Bowie's career.

1968–1971: Space Oddity to Hunky Dory 

Studying the dramatic arts under Lindsay Kemp, from avant-garde theatre and mime to commedia dell'arte, Bowie became immersed in the creation of personae to present to the world. Satirising life in a British prison, the Bowie composition "Over The Wall We Go" became a 1967 single for Oscar; another Bowie song, "Silly Boy Blue", was released by Billy Fury the following year. Playing acoustic guitar, Hermione Farthingale formed a group with Bowie and guitarist John Hutchinson named Feathers; between September 1968 and early 1969 the trio gave a small number of concerts combining folk, Merseybeat, poetry, and mime.

After the break-up with Farthingale, Bowie moved in with Mary Finnigan as her lodger. In February and March 1969, he undertook a short tour with Marc Bolan's duo Tyrannosaurus Rex, as third on the bill, performing a mime act. On 11 July 1969, "Space Oddity" was released five days ahead of the Apollo 11 launch, and reached the top five in the UK. Continuing the divergence from rock and roll and blues begun by his work with Farthingale, Bowie joined forces with Finnigan, Christina Ostrom and Barrie Jackson to run a folk club on Sunday nights at the Three Tuns pub in Beckenham High Street. The club was influenced by the Arts Lab movement, developing into the Beckenham Arts Lab and became extremely popular. The Arts Lab hosted a free festival in a local park, the subject of his song "Memory of a Free Festival".

Bowie's second album followed in November; originally issued in the UK as David Bowie, it caused some confusion with its predecessor of the same name, and the early US release was instead titled Man of Words/Man of Music; it was reissued internationally in 1972 by RCA Records as Space Oddity. Featuring philosophical post-hippie lyrics on peace, love, and morality, its acoustic folk rock occasionally fortified by harder rock, the album was not a commercial success at the time of its release.

Bowie met Angela Barnett in April 1969. They married within a year. Her impact on him was immediate, and her involvement in his career far-reaching, leaving manager Kenneth Pitt with limited influence which he found frustrating. Having established himself as a solo artist with "Space Oddity", Bowie began to sense a lacking: "a full-time band for gigs and recording—people he could relate to personally". The shortcoming was underlined by his artistic rivalry with Marc Bolan, who was at the time acting as his session guitarist. The band Bowie assembled comprised John Cambridge, a drummer Bowie met at the Arts Lab, Tony Visconti on bass and Mick Ronson on electric guitar. Known as Hype, the bandmates created characters for themselves and wore elaborate costumes that prefigured the glam style of the Spiders from Mars. After a disastrous opening gig at the London Roundhouse, they reverted to a configuration presenting Bowie as a solo artist. Their initial studio work was marred by a heated disagreement between Bowie and Cambridge over the latter's drumming style. Matters came to a head when an enraged Bowie accused the drummer of the disturbance, exclaiming "You're fucking up my album." Cambridge left and was replaced by Mick Woodmansey. Not long after, Bowie fired his manager and replaced him with Tony Defries. This resulted in years of litigation that concluded with Bowie having to pay Pitt compensation.

The studio sessions continued and resulted in Bowie's third album, The Man Who Sold the World (1970), which contained references to schizophrenia, paranoia, and delusion. It represented a departure from the acoustic guitar and folk-rock style established by Space Oddity, to a more hard rock sound. To promote it in the US, Mercury Records financed a coast-to-coast publicity tour across America in which Bowie, between January and February 1971, was interviewed by radio stations and the media. Exploiting his androgynous appearance, the original cover of the UK version unveiled two months later depicted Bowie wearing a dress. He took the dress with him and wore it during interviews, to the approval of critics – including Rolling Stones John Mendelsohn, who described him as "ravishing, almost disconcertingly reminiscent of Lauren Bacall" – and in the street, to mixed reaction including laughter and, in the case of one male pedestrian, producing a gun and telling Bowie to "kiss my ass".

During the tour, Bowie's observation of two seminal American proto-punk artists led him to develop a concept that eventually found form in the Ziggy Stardust character: a melding of the persona of Iggy Pop with the music of Lou Reed, producing "the ultimate pop idol". A girlfriend recalled his "scrawling notes on a cocktail napkin about a crazy rock star named Iggy or Ziggy", and on his return to England he declared his intention to create a character "who looks like he's landed from Mars". The "Stardust" surname was a tribute to the "Legendary Stardust Cowboy", whose record he was given during the tour. Bowie would later cover "I Took a Trip on a Gemini Space Ship" on 2002's Heathen.

Hunky Dory (1971) found Visconti supplanted in both roles by Ken Scott producing and Trevor Bolder on bass. It again featured a stylistic shift towards art pop and melodic pop rock. It featured light fare tracks such as "Kooks", a song written for his son, Duncan Zowie Haywood Jones, born on 30 May. Elsewhere, the album explored more serious subjects, and found Bowie paying unusually direct homage to his influences with "Song for Bob Dylan", "Andy Warhol", and "Queen Bitch", the latter a Velvet Underground pastiche. His first release through RCA Records, it was a commercial failure, partly due lack of promotion from the label.

1972–1974: Glam rock era

Dressed in a striking costume, his hair dyed reddish-brown, Bowie launched his Ziggy Stardust stage show with the Spiders from Mars—Ronson, Bolder, and Woodmansey—at the Toby Jug pub in Tolworth in Kingston upon Thames on 10 February 1972. The show was hugely popular, catapulting him to stardom as he toured the UK over the next six months and creating, as described by Buckley, a "cult of Bowie" that was "unique—its influence lasted longer and has been more creative than perhaps almost any other force within pop fandom." The Rise and Fall of Ziggy Stardust and the Spiders from Mars (1972), combining the hard rock elements of The Man Who Sold the World with the lighter experimental rock and pop of Hunky Dory, was released in June and was considered one of the defining albums of glam rock. "Starman", issued as an April single ahead of the album, was to cement Bowie's UK breakthrough: both single and album charted rapidly following his July Top of the Pops performance of the song. The album, which remained in the chart for two years, was soon joined there by the six-month-old Hunky Dory. At the same time, the non-album single "John, I'm Only Dancing", and "All the Young Dudes", a song he wrote and produced for Mott the Hoople, were successful in the UK. The Ziggy Stardust Tour continued to the United States.

Bowie contributed backing vocals, keyboards, and guitar to Reed's 1972 solo breakthrough Transformer, co-producing the album with Mick Ronson. The following year, Bowie co-produced and mixed the Stooges' album Raw Power alongside Iggy Pop. His own Aladdin Sane (1973) topped the UK chart, his first number-one album. Described by Bowie as "Ziggy goes to America", it contained songs he wrote while travelling to and across the US during the earlier part of the Ziggy tour, which now continued to Japan to promote the new album. Aladdin Sane spawned the UK top five singles "The Jean Genie" and "Drive-In Saturday".

Bowie's love of acting led to his total immersion in the characters he created for his music. "Offstage I'm a robot. Onstage I achieve emotion. It's probably why I prefer dressing up as Ziggy to being David." With satisfaction came severe personal difficulties: acting the same role over an extended period, it became impossible for him to separate Ziggy Stardust—and later, the Thin White Duke—from his own character offstage. Ziggy, Bowie said, "wouldn't leave me alone for years. That was when it all started to go sour ... My whole personality was affected. It became very dangerous. I really did have doubts about my sanity." His later Ziggy shows, which included songs from both Ziggy Stardust and Aladdin Sane, were ultra-theatrical affairs filled with shocking stage moments, such as Bowie stripping down to a sumo wrestling loincloth or simulating oral sex with Ronson's guitar. Bowie toured and gave press conferences as Ziggy before a dramatic and abrupt on-stage "retirement" at London's Hammersmith Odeon on 3 July 1973. Footage from the final show was incorporated for the film Ziggy Stardust and the Spiders from Mars, which premiered in 1979 and commercially released in 1983.

After breaking up the Spiders from Mars, Bowie attempted to move on from his Ziggy persona. His back catalogue was now highly sought after: The Man Who Sold the World had been re-released in 1972 along with Space Oddity. "Life on Mars?", from Hunky Dory, was released in June 1973 and peaked at number three on the UK Singles Chart. Entering the same chart in September, Bowie's novelty record from 1967, "The Laughing Gnome", reached number six. Pin Ups, a collection of covers of his 1960s favourites, followed in October, producing a UK number three hit in his version of the McCoys's "Sorrow" and itself peaking at number one, making David Bowie the best-selling act of 1973 in the UK. It brought the total number of Bowie albums concurrently on the UK chart to six.

1974–1976: "Plastic soul" and the Thin White Duke

Bowie moved to the US in 1974, initially staying in New York City before settling in Los Angeles. Diamond Dogs (1974), parts of which found him heading towards soul and funk, was the product of two distinct ideas: a musical based on a wild future in a post-apocalyptic city, and setting George Orwell's 1984 to music. The album went to number one in the UK, spawning the hits "Rebel Rebel" and "Diamond Dogs", and number five in the US. To promote it, Bowie launched the Diamond Dogs Tour, visiting cities in North America between June and December 1974. Choreographed by Toni Basil, and lavishly produced with theatrical special effects, the high-budget stage production was filmed by Alan Yentob. The resulting documentary, Cracked Actor, featured a pasty and emaciated Bowie: the tour coincided with his slide from heavy cocaine use into addiction, producing severe physical debilitation, paranoia, and emotional problems. He later commented that the accompanying live album, David Live, ought to have been titled "David Bowie Is Alive and Well and Living Only in Theory". David Live nevertheless solidified Bowie's status as a superstar, charting at number two in the UK and number eight in the US. It also spawned a UK number ten hit in Bowie's cover of Eddie Floyd's "Knock on Wood". After a break in Philadelphia, where Bowie recorded new material, the tour resumed with a new emphasis on soul.

The fruit of the Philadelphia recording sessions was Young Americans (1975). Sandford writes, "Over the years, most British rockers had tried, one way or another, to become black-by-extension. Few had succeeded as Bowie did now." The album's sound, which Bowie identified as "plastic soul", constituted a radical shift in style that initially alienated many of his UK devotees. Young Americans yielded Bowie's first US number one, "Fame", co-written with John Lennon, who contributed backing vocals, and Carlos Alomar. Lennon called Bowie's work "great, but it's just rock'n'roll with lipstick on". Earning the distinction of being one of the first white artists to appear on the US variety show Soul Train, Bowie mimed "Fame", as well as "Golden Years", his November single, which was originally offered to Elvis Presley, who declined it. Young Americans was a commercial success in both the US and the UK, and a re-issue of the 1969 single "Space Oddity" became Bowie's first number-one hit in the UK a few months after "Fame" achieved the same in the US. Despite his by now well-established superstardom, Bowie, in the words of Sandford, "for all his record sales (over a million copies of Ziggy Stardust alone), existed essentially on loose change." In 1975, in a move echoing Pitt's acrimonious dismissal five years earlier, Bowie fired his manager. At the culmination of the ensuing months-long legal dispute, he watched, as described by Sandford, "millions of dollars of his future earnings being surrendered" in what were "uniquely generous terms for Defries", then "shut himself up in West 20th Street, where for a week his howls could be heard through the locked attic door." Michael Lippman, Bowie's lawyer during the negotiations, became his new manager; Lippman, in turn, was awarded substantial compensation when Bowie fired him the following year.

Station to Station (1976), produced by Bowie and Harry Maslin, introduced a new Bowie persona, "The Thin White Duke" of its title-track. Visually, the character was an extension of Thomas Jerome Newton, the extraterrestrial being he portrayed in the film The Man Who Fell to Earth the same year. Developing the funk and soul of Young Americans, Station to Stations synthesizer-heavy arrangements prefigured the krautrock-influenced music of his next releases. The extent to which drug addiction was now affecting Bowie was made public when Russell Harty interviewed him for his London Weekend Television talk show in anticipation of the album's supporting tour. Shortly before the satellite-linked interview was scheduled to commence, the death of the Spanish dictator Francisco Franco was announced. Bowie was asked to relinquish the satellite booking, to allow the Spanish Government to put out a live newsfeed. This he refused to do, and his interview went ahead. In the ensuing lengthy conversation with Harty, Bowie was incoherent and looked "disconnected". His sanity—by his own later admission—had become twisted from cocaine; he overdosed several times during the year and was withering physically to an alarming degree.

Station to Stations January 1976 release was followed in February by a -month-long concert tour of Europe and North America. Featuring a starkly lit set, the Isolar – 1976 Tour with its colour newsprint Isolar concert program, highlighted songs from the album, including the dramatic and lengthy title track, the ballads "Wild Is the Wind" and "Word on a Wing", and the funkier "TVC 15" and "Stay". The core band that coalesced to record this album and tour—rhythm guitarist Carlos Alomar, bassist George Murray, and drummer Dennis Davis—continued as a stable unit for the remainder of the 1970s. The tour was highly successful but mired in political controversy. Bowie was quoted in Stockholm as saying that "Britain could benefit from a Fascist leader", and was detained by customs on the Russian/Polish border for possessing Nazi paraphernalia.

Matters came to a head in London in May in what became known as the "Victoria Station incident". Arriving in an open-top Mercedes convertible, Bowie waved to the crowd in a gesture that some alleged was a Nazi salute, which was captured on camera and published in NME. Bowie said the photographer caught him in mid-wave. He later blamed his pro-fascism comments and his behaviour during the period on his addictions and the character of the Thin White Duke. "I was out of my mind, totally crazed. The main thing I was functioning on was mythology ... that whole thing about Hitler and Rightism ... I'd discovered King Arthur". According to playwright Alan Franks, writing later in The Times, "he was indeed 'deranged'. He had some very bad experiences with hard drugs." Bowie's cocaine addiction, which had motivated these controversies, had much to do with his time living in Los Angeles, a city which alienated him. Discussing his flirtations with fascism in a 1980 interview with NME, Bowie explained that Los Angeles was "where it had all happened. The fucking place should be wiped off the face of the Earth. To be anything to do with rock and roll and go and live in Los Angeles is, I think, just heading for disaster. It really is."

After recovering from addiction, Bowie apologised for these statements, and throughout the 1980s and 1990s criticised racism in European politics and the American music industry. Nevertheless, Bowie's comments on fascism, as well as Eric Clapton's alcohol-fuelled denunciations of Pakistani immigrants in 1976, led to the establishment of Rock Against Racism.

1976–1979: Berlin era

Before the end of 1976, Bowie's interest in the burgeoning German music scene, as well as his drug addiction, prompted him to move to West Berlin to clean up and revitalise his career. There he was often seen riding a bicycle between his apartment on Hauptstraße in Schöneberg and Hansa Tonstudio, the recording studio he used, located on Köthener Straße in Kreuzberg, near the Berlin Wall. While working with Brian Eno and sharing an apartment with Iggy Pop, he began to focus on minimalist, ambient music for the first of three albums, co-produced with Tony Visconti, that became known as the Berlin Trilogy. During the same period, Iggy Pop, with Bowie as a co-writer and musician, completed his solo album debut The Idiot and its follow-up Lust for Life, touring the UK, Europe, and the US in March and April 1977.

The album Low (1977), partly influenced by the Krautrock sound of Kraftwerk and Neu!, evinced a move away from narration in Bowie's songwriting to a more abstract musical form in which lyrics were sporadic and optional. Although he completed the album in November 1976, it took his unsettled record company another three months to release it. It received considerable negative criticism upon its release—a release which RCA, anxious to maintain the established commercial momentum, did not welcome, and which Bowie's former manager, Tony Defries, who maintained a significant financial interest in Bowie's affairs, tried to prevent. Despite these forebodings, Low yielded the UK number three single "Sound and Vision", and its own performance surpassed that of Station to Station in the UK chart, where it reached number two. Contemporary composer Philip Glass described Low as "a work of genius" in 1992, when he used it as the basis for his Symphony No. 1 "Low"; subsequently, Glass used Bowie's next album as the basis for his 1996 Symphony No. 4 "Heroes". Glass has praised Bowie's gift for creating "fairly complex pieces of music, masquerading as simple pieces". Also in 1977, London released Starting Point, a ten-song LP containing releases from Bowie's Deram period (1966–67).

Echoing Lows minimalist, instrumental approach, the second of the trilogy, "Heroes" (1977), incorporated pop and rock to a greater extent, seeing Bowie joined by guitarist Robert Fripp. Like Low, "Heroes" evinced the zeitgeist of the Cold War, symbolised by the divided city of Berlin. Incorporating ambient sounds from a variety of sources including white noise generators, synthesisers and koto, the album was another hit, reaching number three in the UK. Its title-track, though only reaching number 24 in the UK singles chart, gained lasting popularity, and within months had been released in both German and French. Towards the end of the year, Bowie performed the song for Marc Bolan's television show Marc, and again two days later for Bing Crosby's final CBS television Christmas special, when he joined Crosby in "Peace on Earth/Little Drummer Boy", a version of "The Little Drummer Boy" with a new, contrapuntal verse. Five years later, the duet proved a worldwide seasonal hit, charting in the UK at number three on Christmas Day, 1982.

After completing Low and "Heroes", Bowie spent much of 1978 on the Isolar II world tour, bringing the music of the first two Berlin Trilogy albums to almost a million people during 70 concerts in 12 countries. By now he had broken his drug addiction; biographer David Buckley writes that Isolar II was "Bowie's first tour for five years in which he had probably not anaesthetised himself with copious quantities of cocaine before taking the stage. ... Without the oblivion that drugs had brought, he was now in a healthy enough mental condition to want to make friends." Recordings from the tour made up the live album Stage, released the same year. Bowie also recorded narration for an adaptation of Sergei Prokofiev's classical composition Peter and the Wolf, which was released as an album in May 1978.

The final piece in what Bowie called his "triptych", Lodger (1979), eschewed the minimalist, ambient nature of the other two, making a partial return to the drum- and guitar-based rock and pop of his pre-Berlin era. The result was a complex mixture of new wave and world music, in places incorporating Hijaz non-Western scales. Some tracks were composed using Eno and Peter Schmidt's Oblique Strategies cards: "Boys Keep Swinging" entailed band members swapping instruments, "Move On" used the chords from Bowie's early composition "All the Young Dudes" played backwards, and "Red Money" took backing tracks from "Sister Midnight", a piece previously composed with Iggy Pop. The album was recorded in Switzerland. Ahead of its release, RCA's Mel Ilberman described it as "a concept album that portrays the Lodger as a homeless wanderer, shunned and victimized by life's pressures and technology." Regarding the record, Sandford states: "[It] dashed such high hopes with dubious choices, and production that spelt the end—for fifteen years—of Bowie's partnership with Eno." Lodger reached number four in the UK and number 20 in the US, and yielded the UK hit singles "Boys Keep Swinging" and "DJ". Towards the end of the year, Bowie and Angie initiated divorce proceedings, and after months of court battles the marriage was ended in early 1980.

1980–1988: New Romantic and pop era
Scary Monsters (and Super Creeps) (1980) produced the number-one hit "Ashes to Ashes", featuring the textural work of guitar-synthesist Chuck Hammer and revisiting the character of Major Tom from "Space Oddity". The song gave international exposure to the underground New Romantic movement when Bowie visited the London club "Blitz"—the main New Romantic hangout—to recruit several of the regulars (including Steve Strange of the band Visage) to act in the accompanying video, renowned as one of the most innovative of all time. While Scary Monsters used principles established by the Berlin albums, it was considered by critics to be far more direct musically and lyrically. The album's hard rock edge included conspicuous guitar contributions from Robert Fripp, Chuck Hammer, and Pete Townshend. As "Ashes to Ashes" hit number one on the UK charts, Bowie opened a five-month run on Broadway on 29 July, starring as John Merrick in The Elephant Man.

Bowie paired with Queen in 1981 for a one-off single release, "Under Pressure". The duet was a hit, becoming Bowie's third UK number-one single. Bowie was given the lead role in the BBC's 1982 televised adaptation of Bertolt Brecht's play Baal. Coinciding with its transmission, a five-track EP of songs from the play, recorded earlier in Berlin, was released as David Bowie in Bertolt Brecht's Baal. In March 1982, the month before Paul Schrader's film Cat People came out, Bowie's title song, "Cat People (Putting Out Fire)", was released as a single, becoming a minor US hit and entering the UK Top 30.

Bowie reached his peak of popularity and commercial success in 1983 with Let's Dance. Co-produced by Chic's Nile Rodgers, the album went platinum in both the UK and the US. Its three singles became Top 20 hits in both countries, where its title track reached number one. "Modern Love" and "China Girl" each made number two in the UK, accompanied by a pair of "absorbing" promotional videos that biographer David Buckley said "activated key archetypes in the pop world... 'Let's Dance', with its little narrative surrounding the young Aboriginal couple, targeted 'youth', and 'China Girl', with its bare-bummed (and later partially censored) beach lovemaking scene (a homage to the film From Here to Eternity), was sufficiently sexually provocative to guarantee heavy rotation on MTV". Stevie Ray Vaughan was a guest guitarist playing solo on "Let's Dance", although the video depicts Bowie miming this part. By 1983, Bowie had emerged as one of the most important video artists of the day. Let's Dance was followed by the Serious Moonlight Tour, during which Bowie was accompanied by guitarist Earl Slick and backing vocalists Frank and George Simms. The world tour lasted six months and was extremely popular. At the 1984 MTV Video Music Awards Bowie received two awards including the inaugural Video Vanguard Award.

Tonight (1984), another dance-oriented album, found Bowie collaborating with Tina Turner and, once again, Iggy Pop. It included a number of cover songs, among them the 1966 Beach Boys hit "God Only Knows". The album bore the transatlantic Top 10 hit "Blue Jean", itself the inspiration for a short film that won Bowie a Grammy Award for Best Short Form Music Video, Jazzin' for Blue Jean. Bowie performed at Wembley Stadium in 1985 for Live Aid, a multi-venue benefit concert for Ethiopian famine relief. During the event, the video for a fundraising single, Bowie's duet with Mick Jagger, was premiered. "Dancing in the Street" quickly went to number one on release. The same year, Bowie worked with the Pat Metheny Group to record "This Is Not America" for the soundtrack of The Falcon and the Snowman. Released as a single, the song became a Top 40 hit in the UK and US.

Bowie was given a role in the 1986 film Absolute Beginners. It was poorly received by critics, but Bowie's theme song, also named "Absolute Beginners", rose to number two in the UK charts. He also appeared as Jareth, the Goblin King, in the 1986 Jim Henson film Labyrinth, for which he worked with composer Trevor Jones and wrote five original songs. His final solo album of the decade was 1987's Never Let Me Down, where he ditched the light sound of his previous two albums, instead offering harder rock with an industrial/techno dance edge. Peaking at number six in the UK, the album yielded the hits "Day-In, Day-Out", "Time Will Crawl", and "Never Let Me Down". Bowie later described it as his "nadir", calling it "an awful album". Supporting Never Let Me Down, and preceded by nine promotional press shows, the 86-concert Glass Spider Tour commenced on 30 May. Bowie's backing band included Peter Frampton on lead guitar. Contemporary critics maligned the tour as overproduced, saying it pandered to the current stadium rock trends in its special effects and dancing, although in later years critics acknowledged the tour's strengths and influence on concert tours by other artists, such as Britney Spears, Madonna, and U2.

1989–1991: Tin Machine

Bowie shelved his solo career in 1989, retreating to the relative anonymity of band membership for the first time since the early 1970s. A hard-rocking quartet, Tin Machine came into being after Bowie began to work experimentally with guitarist Reeves Gabrels. The line-up was completed by Tony and Hunt Sales, whom Bowie had known since the late 1970s for their contribution, on bass and drums respectively, to Iggy Pop's 1977 album Lust for Life. The Sales brothers are sons of American comedian and actor Soupy Sales. Although he intended Tin Machine to operate as a democracy, Bowie dominated, both in songwriting and in decision-making. The band's album debut, Tin Machine (1989), was initially popular, though its politicised lyrics did not find universal approval: Bowie described one song as "a simplistic, naive, radical, laying-it-down about the emergence of Neo-Nazis"; in the view of Sandford, "It took nerve to denounce drugs, fascism and TV ... in terms that reached the literary level of a comic book." EMI complained of "lyrics that preach" as well as "repetitive tunes" and "minimalist or no production". The album nevertheless reached number three and went gold in the UK.

Tin Machine's first world tour was a commercial success, but there was growing reluctance—among fans and critics alike—to accept Bowie's presentation as merely a band member. A series of Tin Machine singles failed to chart, and Bowie, after a disagreement with EMI, left the label. Like his audience and his critics, Bowie himself became increasingly disaffected with his role as just one member of a band. Tin Machine began work on a second album, but Bowie put the venture on hold and made a return to solo work. Performing his early hits during the seven-month Sound+Vision Tour, he found commercial success and acclaim once again.

In October 1990, a decade after his divorce from Angie, Bowie and Somali-born supermodel Iman were introduced by a mutual friend. Bowie recalled, "I was naming the children the night we met ... it was absolutely immediate." They married in 1992. Tin Machine resumed work the same month, but their audience and critics, ultimately left disappointed by the first album, showed little interest in a second. Tin Machine IIs arrival was marked by a widely publicised and ill-timed conflict over the cover art: after production had begun, the new record label, Victory, deemed the depiction of four ancient nude Kouroi statues, judged by Bowie to be "in exquisite taste", to be "a show of wrong, obscene images", requiring air-brushing and patching to render the figures sexless. Tin Machine toured again, but after the live album Tin Machine Live: Oy Vey, Baby failed commercially, the band drifted apart, and Bowie, though he continued to collaborate with Gabrels, resumed his solo career.

1992–1998: Electronic period
On 20 April 1992, Bowie appeared at The Freddie Mercury Tribute Concert, following the Queen singer's death the previous year. As well as performing "Heroes" and "All the Young Dudes", he was joined on "Under Pressure" by Annie Lennox, who took Mercury's vocal part; during his appearance, Bowie knelt and recited the Lord's Prayer at Wembley Stadium. Four days later, Bowie and Iman were married in Switzerland. Intending to move to Los Angeles, they flew in to search for a suitable property, but found themselves confined to their hotel, under curfew: the 1992 Los Angeles riots began the day they arrived. They settled in New York instead.

In 1993, Bowie released his first solo offering since his Tin Machine departure, the soul, jazz, and hip-hop influenced Black Tie White Noise. Making prominent use of electronic instruments, the album, which reunited Bowie with Let's Dance producer Nile Rodgers, confirmed Bowie's return to popularity, hitting the number-one spot on the UK charts and spawning three Top 40 hits, including the Top 10 single "Jump They Say". Bowie explored new directions on The Buddha of Suburbia (1993), ostensibly a soundtrack album of his music composed for the BBC television adaptation of Hanif Kureishi's novel. Only the title track had been used in the television adaptation, although some of his themes for it were also present on the album. It contained some of the new elements introduced in Black Tie White Noise, and also signalled a move towards alternative rock. The album was a critical success but received a low-key release and only made number 87 in the UK charts.

Reuniting Bowie with Eno, the quasi-industrial Outside (1995) was originally conceived as the first volume in a non-linear narrative of art and murder. Featuring characters from a short story written by Bowie, the album achieved UK and US chart success and yielded three Top 40 UK singles. In a move that provoked mixed reactions from both fans and critics, Bowie chose Nine Inch Nails as his tour partner for the Outside Tour. Visiting cities in Europe and North America between September 1995 and February 1996, the tour saw the return of Gabrels as Bowie's guitarist. On 7 January 1997, Bowie celebrated his half century with a 50th birthday concert at Madison Square Garden, New York, at which he was joined in playing his songs and those of his guests, Lou Reed, Dave Grohl and the Foo Fighters, Robert Smith of the Cure, Billy Corgan of the Smashing Pumpkins, Black Francis of the Pixies, and Sonic Youth.

Incorporating experiments in British jungle and drum 'n' bass, Earthling (1997) was a critical and commercial success in the UK and the US, and two singles from the album — "Little Wonder" and "Dead Man Walking" — became UK Top 40 hits. Bowie's song "I'm Afraid of Americans" from the Paul Verhoeven film Showgirls was re-recorded for the album, and remixed by Trent Reznor for a single release. The heavy rotation of the accompanying video, also featuring Trent Reznor, contributed to the song's 16-week stay in the US Billboard Hot 100. Reznor also executive produced the Lost Highway soundtrack (1997) which begins and ends with different mixes of Bowie's Outside song "I'm Deranged". Bowie received a star on the Hollywood Walk of Fame on 12 February 1997. The Earthling Tour took place in Europe and North America between June and November 1997. In November 1997, Bowie performed on the BBC's Children in Need charity single "Perfect Day", which reached number one in the UK. Bowie reunited with Visconti in 1998 to record "(Safe in This) Sky Life" for The Rugrats Movie. Although the track was edited out of the final cut, it was later re-recorded and released as "Safe" on the B-side of Bowie's 2002 single "Everyone Says 'Hi'. The reunion led to other collaborations including a limited-edition single release version of Placebo's track "Without You I'm Nothing", co-produced by Visconti, with Bowie's harmonised vocal added to the original recording.

1999–2012: Neoclassicist era

Bowie, with Gabrels, created the soundtrack for Omikron: The Nomad Soul, a 1999 computer game in which he and Iman also voiced characters based on their likenesses. Released the same year and containing re-recorded tracks from Omikron, his album Hours featured a song with lyrics by the winner of his "Cyber Song Contest" Internet competition, Alex Grant. Making extensive use of live instruments, the album was Bowie's exit from heavy electronica. Hours and a performance on VH1 Storytellers in mid-1999 represented the end of Gabrels' association with Bowie as a performer and songwriter. Sessions for the planned album Toy, intended to feature new versions of some of Bowie's earliest pieces as well as three new songs, commenced in 2000, but the album remained officially unreleased until 2021. Bowie and Visconti continued their collaboration, producing a new album of completely original songs instead: the result of the sessions was the 2002 album Heathen.

On 25 June 2000, Bowie made his second appearance at the Glastonbury Festival in England, playing almost 30 years after his first. The performance was released as a live album in November 2018. On 27 June, he performed a concert at the BBC Radio Theatre in London, which was released on the compilation album Bowie at the Beeb; this also featured BBC recording sessions from 1968 to 1972. Bowie and Iman's daughter was born on 15 August. His interest in Buddhism led him to support the Tibetan cause by performing at the February 2001 and February 2003 concerts to support Tibet House US at Carnegie Hall in New York.

In October 2001, Bowie opened the Concert for New York City, a charity event to benefit the victims of the September 11 attacks, with a minimalist performance of Simon & Garfunkel's "America", followed by a full band performance of "Heroes". 2002 saw the release of Heathen, and, during the second half of the year, the Heathen Tour. Taking place in Europe and North America, the tour opened at London's annual Meltdown festival, for which Bowie was that year appointed artistic director. Among the acts he selected for the festival were Philip Glass, Television, and the Dandy Warhols. As well as songs from the new album, the tour featured material from Bowie's Low era. Reality (2003) followed, and its accompanying world tour, the A Reality Tour, with an estimated attendance of 722,000, grossed more than any other in 2004. On 13 June, Bowie headlined the last night of the Isle of Wight Festival 2004, his final live show in the UK. On 25 June, he experienced chest pain while performing at the Hurricane Festival in Scheeßel, Germany. Originally thought to be a pinched nerve in his shoulder, the pain was later diagnosed as an acutely blocked coronary artery, requiring an emergency angioplasty in Hamburg. The remaining 14 dates of the tour were cancelled.

In the years following his recuperation from the heart attack, Bowie reduced his musical output, making only one-off appearances on stage and in the studio. He sang in a duet of his 1971 song "Changes" with Butterfly Boucher for the 2004 animated film Shrek 2. During a relatively quiet 2005, he recorded the vocals for the song "(She Can) Do That", co-written with Brian Transeau, for the film Stealth. He returned to the stage on 8 September 2005, appearing with Arcade Fire for the US nationally televised event Fashion Rocks, and performed with the Canadian band for the second time a week later during the CMJ Music Marathon. He contributed backing vocals on TV on the Radio's song "Province" for their album Return to Cookie Mountain, and joined with Lou Reed on Danish alt-rockers Kashmir's 2005 album No Balance Palace.

Bowie was awarded the Grammy Lifetime Achievement Award on 8 February 2006. In April, he announced, "I'm taking a year off—no touring, no albums." He made a surprise guest appearance at David Gilmour's 29 May concert at the Royal Albert Hall in London. The event was recorded, and a selection of songs on which he had contributed joint vocals were subsequently released. He performed again in November, alongside Alicia Keys, at the Black Ball, a benefit event for Keep a Child Alive at the Hammerstein Ballroom in New York. The performance marked the last time Bowie performed his music on stage.

Bowie was chosen to curate the 2007 High Line Festival. The musicians and artists he selected for the Manhattan event included electronic pop duo AIR, surrealist photographer Claude Cahun and English comedian Ricky Gervais. Bowie performed on Scarlett Johansson's 2008 album of Tom Waits covers, Anywhere I Lay My Head. In June 2008 a live album was released of a Ziggy Stardust-era concert from 1972. On the 40th anniversary of the July 1969 moon landing—and Bowie's accompanying commercial breakthrough with "Space Oddity"—EMI released the individual tracks from the original eight-track studio recording of the song, in a 2009 contest inviting members of the public to create a remix. A Reality Tour, a double album of live material from the 2003 concert tour, was released in January 2010.

In late March 2011, Toy, Bowie's previously unreleased album from 2001, was leaked onto the internet, containing material used for Heathen and most of its single B-sides, as well as unheard new versions of his early back catalogue.

2013–2016: Final years
On 8 January 2013, his 66th birthday, his website announced a new album, to be titled The Next Day and scheduled for release in March. Bowie's first studio album in a decade, The Next Day contains 14 songs plus 3 bonus tracks. His website acknowledged the length of his hiatus. Producer and longtime collaborator Tony Visconti said 29 tracks were recorded for the album, some of which could appear on Bowie's next record, which he might start work on later in 2013. The announcement was accompanied by the immediate release of a single, "Where Are We Now?", written and recorded by Bowie in New York and produced by Visconti.

A music video for "Where Are We Now?" was released onto Vimeo the same day, directed by New York artist Tony Oursler. The single topped the UK iTunes Chart within hours of its release, and debuted in the UK Singles Chart at number six, his first single to enter the Top 10 for two decades (since "Jump They Say" in 1993).  A second video, "The Stars (Are Out Tonight)", was released 25 February. Directed by Floria Sigismondi, it stars Bowie and Tilda Swinton as a married couple. On 1 March, the album was made available to stream for free through iTunes. The Next Day debuted at number one on the UK Albums Chart, was his first album to achieve that position since Black Tie White Noise (1993), and was the fastest-selling album of 2013 at the time. The music video for the song "The Next Day" created some controversy, initially being removed from YouTube for terms-of-service violation, then restored with a warning recommending viewing only by those 18 or over.

According to The Times, Bowie ruled out ever giving an interview again. Later in 2013, Bowie was featured in a cameo vocal in the Arcade Fire song "Reflektor". A poll carried out by BBC History Magazine, in October 2013, named Bowie as the best-dressed Briton in history. In mid-2014, Bowie was diagnosed with liver cancer, a diagnosis he kept private. New information was released in September 2014 regarding his next compilation album, Nothing Has Changed, which was released in November. The album featured rare tracks and old material from his catalogue in addition to a new song titled "Sue (Or in a Season of Crime)". In May 2015, "Let's Dance" was announced to be reissued as a yellow vinyl single on 16 July 2015 in conjunction with the David Bowie Is exhibition at the Australian Centre for the Moving Image in Melbourne, Australia.

In August 2015, it was announced that Bowie was writing songs for a Broadway musical based on the SpongeBob SquarePants cartoon series; the final production included a retooled version of "No Control" from Outside. Bowie wrote and recorded the opening title song to the television series The Last Panthers, which aired in November 2015. The theme that was used for The Last Panthers was also the title track for his January 2016 release Blackstar which is said to take cues from his earlier krautrock-influenced work. According to The Times: "Blackstar may be the oddest work yet from Bowie". On 7 December 2015, Bowie's musical Lazarus debuted in New York. His last public appearance was at opening night of the production.

Blackstar was released on 8 January 2016, Bowie's 69th birthday, and was met with critical acclaim. Following his death on 10 January, Visconti revealed that Bowie had planned the album to be his swan song, and a "parting gift" for his fans before his death. Several reporters and critics subsequently noted that most of the lyrics on the album seem to revolve around his impending death, with CNN noting that the album "reveals a man who appears to be grappling with his own mortality". Visconti later said that Bowie had been planning a post-Blackstar album, and had written and recorded demo versions of five songs in his final weeks, suggesting that Bowie believed he had a few months left. The day following his death, online viewing of Bowie's music skyrocketed, breaking the record for Vevo's most viewed artist in a single day. On 15 January, Blackstar debuted at number one on the UK Albums Chart; nineteen of his albums were in the UK Top 100 Albums Chart, and thirteen singles were in the UK Top 100 Singles Chart. Blackstar also debuted at number one on album charts around the world, including Australia, France, Germany, Italy, New Zealand, and the US Billboard 200.

Acting career

While always primarily a musician, Bowie took acting roles throughout his career, appearing in over 30 films, television shows and theatrical productions. Bowie's acting career was "productively selective", largely eschewing starring roles for cameos and supporting parts. Many critics have observed that, had Bowie not chosen to pursue music, he could have found great success as an actor. Other critics have noted that, while his screen presence was singular, his best contributions to film were the use of his songs in films such as Lost Highway, A Knight's Tale, The Life Aquatic with Steve Zissou and Inglourious Basterds.

1960s and 1970s 
The beginnings of Bowie's acting career predate his commercial breakthrough as a musician. Studying avant-garde theatre and mime under Lindsay Kemp, he was given the role of Cloud in Kemp's 1967 theatrical production Pierrot in Turquoise (later made into the 1970 television film The Looking Glass Murders). Bowie filmed a walk-on role for the BBC drama series Theater 625 that aired in May 1968. In the black-and-white short The Image (1969), he played a ghostly boy who emerges from a troubled artist's painting to haunt him. The same year, the film of Leslie Thomas's 1966 comic novel The Virgin Soldiers saw Bowie make a brief appearance as an extra.

In 1976, Bowie earned acclaim for his first major film role, portraying Thomas Jerome Newton, an alien from a dying planet, in The Man Who Fell to Earth, directed by Nicolas Roeg. He later admitted that his severe cocaine use during the film's production left him in such a fragile state of mind that he barely understood the film. Just a Gigolo (1979), an Anglo-German co-production directed by David Hemmings, saw Bowie in the lead role as Prussian officer Paul von Przygodski, who, returning from World War I, is discovered by a Baroness (Marlene Dietrich) and put into her gigolo stable. The film was a critical and commercial bomb, and Bowie later expressed embarrassment at his role in it.

1980s 

Bowie played Joseph Merrick in the Broadway theatre production The Elephant Man, which he undertook wearing no stage make-up, and which earned high praise for his expressive performance. He played the part 157 times between 1980 and 1981. Christiane F. – We Children from Bahnhof Zoo, a 1981 biographical film focusing on a young girl's drug addiction in West Berlin, featured Bowie in a cameo appearance as himself at a concert in Germany. Its soundtrack album, Christiane F. (1981), featured much material from his Berlin Trilogy albums. In 1982, he starred in the titular role in a BBC adaptation of the Bertolt Brecht play Baal. Bowie portrayed a vampire in Tony Scott's erotic horror film The Hunger (1983), with Catherine Deneuve and Susan Sarandon. In Nagisa Oshima's film the same year, Merry Christmas, Mr. Lawrence, based on Laurens van der Post's novel The Seed and the Sower, Bowie played Major Jack Celliers, a prisoner of war in a Japanese internment camp. Bowie had a cameo in Yellowbeard, a 1983 pirate comedy created by Monty Python members and directed by Mel Damski.

To promote the single "Blue Jean", Bowie filmed the 21 minute short film Jazzin' for Blue Jean (1984) with director Julien Temple, and played the dual roles of romantic protagonist Vic and arrogant rock star Screaming Lord Byron. The short won Bowie his only non-posthumous Grammy award. Bowie had a supporting role as hitman Colin in the 1985 John Landis film Into the Night. He declined to play the villain Max Zorin in the James Bond film A View to a Kill (1985). Bowie reteamed with Temple for Absolute Beginners (1986), a rock musical film adapted from Colin MacInnes's book of the same name about life in late 1950s London, in a supporting role as ad man Vendice Partners. The same year, Jim Henson's dark musical fantasy Labyrinth cast him as Jareth, the villainous Goblin King. Despite initial poor box office, the film grew in popularity and became a cult film. Two years later, he played Pontius Pilate in Martin Scorsese's critically acclaimed biblical epic The Last Temptation of Christ (1988).

1990s 
In 1991, Bowie reteamed with director John Landis for an episode of the HBO sitcom Dream On and played a disgruntled restaurant employee opposite Rosanna Arquette in The Linguini Incident. Bowie portrayed the mysterious FBI agent Phillip Jeffries in David Lynch's Twin Peaks: Fire Walk with Me (1992). The prequel to the television series was poorly received at the time of its release, but has since been critically reevaluated. He took a small but pivotal role as his friend Andy Warhol in Basquiat, artist/director Julian Schnabel's 1996 biopic of Jean-Michel Basquiat, another artist he considered a friend and colleague. Bowie co-starred in Giovanni Veronesi's Spaghetti Western Il Mio West (1998, released as Gunslinger's Revenge in the US in 2005) as the most feared gunfighter in the region. He played the ageing gangster Bernie in Andrew Goth's Everybody Loves Sunshine (1999, released in the US as B.U.S.T.E.D.), and appeared as the host in the second season of the television horror anthology series The Hunger. Despite having several episodes which focus on vampires and Bowie's involvement, the show had no plot connection to the 1983 film of the same name. In 1999, Bowie voiced two characters in the Sega Dreamcast game Omikron: The Nomad Soul, his only appearance in a video game.

2000s and posthumous notes 
In Mr. Rice's Secret (2000), Bowie played the title role as the neighbour of a terminally ill 12-year-old. Bowie appeared as himself in the 2001 Ben Stiller comedy Zoolander, judging a "walk-off" between rival male models, and in Eric Idle's 2002 mockumentary The Rutles 2: Can't Buy Me Lunch. In 2005, he filmed a commercial with Snoop Dogg for XM Satellite Radio. Bowie portrayed a fictionalised version of physicist and inventor Nikola Tesla in Christopher Nolan's film The Prestige (2006), which was about the bitter rivalry between two magicians in the late 19th century. Nolan later claimed that Bowie was his only preference to play Tesla, and that he personally appealed to Bowie to take the role after he initially passed. In the same year, he voice-acted in Luc Besson's animated film Arthur and the Invisibles as the powerful villain Maltazard, and appeared as himself in an episode of the Ricky Gervais and Stephen Merchant television series Extras. In 2007, he lent his voice to the character Lord Royal Highness in the SpongeBob's Atlantis SquarePantis television film. In the 2008 film August, directed by Austin Chick, he played a supporting role as Ogilvie, a "ruthless venture capitalist." Bowie's final film appearance was a cameo as himself in the 2009 teen comedy Bandslam.

In a 2017 interview with Consequence of Sound, director Denis Villeneuve revealed his intention to cast Bowie in Blade Runner 2049 as the lead villain, Niander Wallace, but when news broke of Bowie's death in January of the same year, Villeneuve was forced to look for talent with similar "rock star" qualities. He eventually cast actor and lead singer of Thirty Seconds to Mars, Jared Leto. Talking about the casting process, Villeneuve said: "Our first thought [for the character] had been David Bowie, who had influenced Blade Runner in many ways. When we learned the sad news, we looked around for someone like that. He [Bowie] embodied the Blade Runner spirit." David Lynch also hoped to have Bowie reprise his Fire Walk With Me character for Twin Peaks: The Return but Bowie's illness prevented this. His character was portrayed via archival footage. At Bowie's request, Lynch overdubbed Bowie's original dialogue with a different actor's voice, as Bowie was unhappy with his Cajun accent in the original film.

Other works

Painter and art collector

Bowie was a painter and artist. He moved to Switzerland in 1976, purchasing a chalet in the hills to the north of Lake Geneva. In the new environment, his cocaine use decreased and he found time for other pursuits outside his musical career. He devoted more time to his painting, and produced a number of post-modernist pieces. When on tour, he took to sketching in a notebook, and photographing scenes for later reference. Visiting galleries in Geneva and the Brücke Museum in Berlin, Bowie became, in the words of Sandford, "a prolific producer and collector of contemporary art. ... Not only did he become a well-known patron of expressionist art: locked in Clos des Mésanges he began an intensive self-improvement course in classical music and literature, and started work on an autobiography."

One of Bowie's paintings sold at auction in late 1990 for $500, and the cover for his 1995 album Outside is a close-up of a self-portrait (from a series of five) he painted that same year. His first solo show, titled New Afro/Pagan and Work: 1975–1995, was in 1995 at The Gallery in Cork Street, London. In 1997, he founded the publishing company 21 Publishing, whose first title was Blimey! – From Bohemia to Britpop: London Art World from Francis Bacon to Damien Hirst by Matthew Collings. A year later, Bowie was invited to join the editorial board of the journal Modern Painters, and participated in the Nat Tate art hoax later that year. The same year, during an interview with Michael Kimmelman for The New York Times, he said "Art was, seriously, the only thing I'd ever wanted to own." Subsequently, in a 1999 interview for the BBC, he said "The only thing I buy obsessively and addictively is art". His art collection, which included works by Damien Hirst, Derek Boshier, Frank Auerbach, Henry Moore, and Jean-Michel Basquiat among others, was valued at over £10m in mid-2016.

After his death, his family decided to sell most of the collection because they "didn't have the space" to store it. On 10 and 11 November, three auctions were held at Sotheby's in London, first with 47 lots and second with 208 paintings, drawings, and sculptures, third with 100 design lots. The items on sale represented about 65 per cent of the collection. Exhibition of the works in the auction attracted 51,470 visitors, the auction itself was attended by 1,750 bidders, with over 1,000 more bidding online. The auctions has overall sale total £32.9 million (app. $41.5 million), while the highest-selling item, Basquiat's graffiti-inspired painting Air Power, sold for £7.09 million.

Writings
Outside of music, Bowie dabbled in several forms of writings during his life. In the late 1990s, Bowie was commissioned for writings of various media, including an essay on Jean-Michel Basquiat for the 2001 anthology book Writers on Artists and forewords to Jo Levin's 2001 publication GQ Cool, Mick Rock's 2001 photography portfolio Blood and Glitter, his wife Iman's 2001 book I Am Iman, Q magazine's 2002 special The 100 Greatest Rock 'n' Roll Photographs and Jonathan Barnbrook's artwork portfolio Barnbrook Bible: The Graphic Design of Jonathan Barnbrook. He also heavily contributed to the 2002 Genesis Publications memoir of the Ziggy Stardust years, Moonage Daydream, which was rereleased in 2022.

Bowie also wrote liner notes for several albums, including Too Many Fish in the Sea by Robin Clark, the wife of his guitarist Carlos Alomar, Stevie Ray Vaughan's posthumous Live at Montreux 1982 & 1985 (2002), the Spinners' compilation The Chrome Collection (2003), the tenth anniversary reissue of Placebo's debut album (2006) and Neu!'s Vinyl Box (2010). Bowie also wrote an appreciation piece in Rolling Stone for Nine Inch Nails in 2005 and an essay for the booklet accompanying Iggy Pop's A Million in Prizes: The Anthology the same year.

Bowie Bonds

"Bowie Bonds", the first modern example of celebrity bonds, were asset-backed securities of current and future revenues of the 25 albums (287 songs) that Bowie recorded before 1990. Issued in 1997, the bonds were bought for US$55 million by the Prudential Insurance Company of America. Royalties from the 25 albums generated the cash flow that secured the bonds' interest payments. By forfeiting 10 years worth of royalties, Bowie received a payment of US$55 million up front. Bowie used this income to buy songs owned by his former manager, Tony Defries. The bonds liquidated in 2007 and the rights to the income from the songs reverted to Bowie.

Websites
Bowie launched two personal websites during his lifetime. The first, an Internet service provider titled BowieNet, was developed in conjunction with Robert Goodale and Ron Roy and launched in September 1998. Subscribers to the dial-up service were offered exclusive content as well as a BowieNet email address and Internet access. The service was closed by 2006. The second, www.bowieart.com, offered fans to view and purchase selected paintings, prints and sculptures from his private collection. The service, which ran from 2000 to 2008, also offered a showcase for young art students, in Bowie's words, "to show and sell their work without having to go through a dealer. Therefore, they really make the money they deserve for their paintings."

Legacy and influence 

Bowie's songs and stagecraft brought a new dimension to popular music in the early 1970s, strongly influencing both its immediate forms and its subsequent development. Bowie was a pioneer of glam rock, according to music historians Schinder and Schwartz, who credited Bowie and Marc Bolan with creating the genre. At the same time, he inspired the innovators of the punk rock music movement. When punk musicians were "noisily reclaiming the three-minute pop song in a show of public defiance", biographer David Buckley wrote that "Bowie almost completely abandoned traditional rock instrumentation." Bowie's record company promoted his unique status in popular music with the slogan, "There's old wave, there's new wave, and there's David Bowie".

Musicologist James Perone credited Bowie with having "brought sophistication to rock music", and critical reviews frequently acknowledged the intellectual depth of his work and influence. The BBC's arts editor Will Gompertz likened Bowie to Pablo Picasso, writing that he was "an innovative, visionary, restless artist who synthesised complex avant garde concepts into beautifully coherent works that touched the hearts and minds of millions".

Broadcaster John Peel contrasted Bowie with his progressive rock contemporaries, arguing that Bowie was "an interesting kind of fringe figure... on the outskirts of things". Peel said he "liked the idea of him reinventing himself... the one distinguishing feature about early-70s progressive rock was that it didn't progress. Before Bowie came along, people didn't want too much change". Buckley called the era "bloated, self-important, leather-clad, self-satisfied"; then Bowie "subverted the whole notion of what it was to be a rock star".

Buckley called Bowie "both star and icon. The vast body of work he has produced ... has created perhaps the biggest cult in popular culture. ... His influence has been unique in popular culture—he has permeated and altered more lives than any comparable figure."

Through continual reinvention, his influence broadened and extended. Biographer Thomas Forget added, "Because he has succeeded in so many different styles of music, it is almost impossible to find a popular artist today that has not been influenced by David Bowie." In 2000, Bowie was voted by other music stars as the "most influential artist of all time" in a poll by NME. Alexis Petridis of The Guardian wrote that Bowie was confirmed by 1980 to be "the most important and influential artist since the Beatles". Neil McCormick of The Daily Telegraph stated that Bowie had "one of the supreme careers in popular music, art and culture of the 20th century" and "he was too inventive, too mercurial, too strange for all but his most devoted fans to keep up with". The BBC's Mark Easton argued that Bowie provided fuel for "the creative powerhouse that Britain has become" by challenging future generations "to aim high, to be ambitious and provocative, to take risks". Easton concluded that Bowie had "changed the way the world sees Britain. And the way Britain sees itself". In 2006, Bowie was voted the fourth greatest living British icon in a poll held by the BBC's Culture Show. Annie Zaleski of Alternative Press wrote, "Every band or solo artist who's decided to rip up their playbook and start again owes a debt to Bowie".

Numerous figures from the music industry whose careers Bowie had influenced paid tribute to him following his death; panegyrics on Twitter (tweets about him peaked at 20,000 a minute an hour after the announcement of his death) also came from outside the entertainment industry and pop culture, such as those from the Vatican, namely Cardinal Gianfranco Ravasi, who quoted "Space Oddity", and the Federal Foreign Office, which thanked Bowie for his part in the fall of the Berlin Wall and referenced "Heroes".

Belgian amateur astronomers at the MIRA Public Observatory in conjunction with Studio Brussel created a "Bowie asterism" in homage to Bowie in January 2016; it depicts the lightning bolt of Aladdin Sane using the stars Sigma Librae, Spica, Zeta Centauri, SAO 204132, Sigma Octantis, SAO 241641 and Beta Trianguli Australis which were near Mars at the time of Bowie's death.

On 7 January 2017, the BBC broadcast the 90-minute documentary David Bowie: The Last Five Years. On 8 January 2017, which would have been Bowie's 70th birthday, a charity concert in his birthplace of Brixton was hosted by actor Gary Oldman, a close friend. A David Bowie walking tour through Brixton was also launched, and other events marking his birthday weekend included concerts in New York, Los Angeles, Sydney, and Tokyo.

On 6 February 2018, the maiden flight of the SpaceX Falcon Heavy rocket carried Elon Musk's personal Tesla Roadster and a mannequin affectionately named Starman into space. "Space Oddity" and "Life on Mars?" were looping on the car's sound system during the launch.

David Bowie Is

An exhibition of Bowie artefacts, called David Bowie Is, was organised by the Victoria and Albert Museum in London, and shown there in 2013. The London exhibit was visited by over 300,000 people, making it one of the most successful exhibitions ever staged at the museum. Later that year the exhibition began a world tour which started in Toronto and included stops in Chicago, Paris, Melbourne, Groningen and Brooklyn, New York where the exhibit ended in 2018 at the Brooklyn Museum. The exhibition hosted around 2,000,000 visitors over the entire course of its run.

Stardust biopic 

A biopic, Stardust, was announced on 31 January 2019, with musician and actor Johnny Flynn as Bowie, Jena Malone as his wife Angie, and Marc Maron as his publicist. The film follows Bowie on his first trip to the United States in 1971. The film was written by Christopher Bell and directed by Gabriel Range. Bowie's son Duncan Jones spoke out against the film, saying he was not consulted and that the film would not have permission to use Bowie's music. The film was set to premiere at the 2020 Tribeca Film Festival, but the festival was postponed due to the COVID-19 pandemic. It received generally unfavourable reviews from critics.

Moonage Daydream

A film based on Bowie's musical journey throughout his career was announced on 23 May 2022. Titled Moonage Daydream, after the song of the same name, the film is written and directed by Brett Morgen and features never-before-seen footage, performances and music framed by Bowie's own narration. Morgan stated that "Bowie cannot be defined, he can be experienced... That is why we crafted 'Moonage Daydream' to be a unique cinematic experience." The documentary is the first posthumous film about Bowie to be approved by his estate. After spending five years in production, the film premiered at the 2022 Cannes Film Festival, was released theatrically in the US in IMAX on 16 September 2022, and will release on HBO Max in the spring of 2023.

Musicianship

From the time of his earliest recordings in the 1960s, Bowie employed a wide variety of musical styles. His early compositions and performances were strongly influenced by rock and roll singers like Little Richard and Elvis Presley, and also the wider world of show business. He particularly strove to emulate the British musical theatre singer-songwriter and actor Anthony Newley, whose vocal style he frequently adopted, and made prominent use of for his 1967 debut release, David Bowie (to the disgust of Newley himself, who destroyed the copy he received from Bowie's publisher). Bowie's fascination with music hall continued to surface sporadically alongside such diverse styles as hard rock and heavy metal, soul, psychedelic folk, and pop.

Musicologist James Perone observes Bowie's use of octave switches for different repetitions of the same melody, exemplified in his commercial breakthrough single, "Space Oddity", and later in the song "Heroes" to dramatic effect; Perone notes that "in the lowest part of his vocal register ... his voice has an almost crooner-like richness."

Voice instructor Jo Thompson describes Bowie's vocal vibrato technique as "particularly deliberate and distinctive". Schinder and Schwartz call him "a vocalist of extraordinary technical ability, able to pitch his singing to particular effect." Here, too, as in his stagecraft and songwriting, Bowie's roleplaying is evident: historiographer Michael Campbell says that Bowie's lyrics "arrest our ear, without question. But Bowie continually shifts from person to person as he delivers them ... His voice changes dramatically from section to section." In addition to the guitar, Bowie also played a variety of keyboards, including piano, Mellotron, Chamberlin, and synthesisers; harmonica; alto and baritone saxophones; stylophone; viola; cello; koto (in the "Heroes" track "Moss Garden"); thumb piano; drums (on the Heathen track "Cactus"), and various percussion instruments.

Personal life

Early relationships
Bowie met dancer Lindsay Kemp in 1967 and enrolled in his dance class at the London Dance Centre. He commented in 1972 that meeting Kemp was when his interest in image "really blossomed". "He lived on his emotions, he was a wonderful influence. His day-to-day life was the most theatrical thing I had ever seen, ever. It was everything I thought Bohemia probably was. I joined the circus." In January 1968, Kemp choreographed a dance scene for a BBC play, The Pistol Shot, in the Theatre 625 series, and used Bowie with a dancer, Hermione Farthingale; the pair began dating and moved into a London flat together. Bowie and Farthingale broke up in early 1969 when she went to Norway to take part in a film, Song of Norway; this affected him, and several songs, such as "Letter to Hermione" and "Life on Mars?", reference her; and, for the video accompanying "Where Are We Now?", he wore a T-shirt with the words "m/s Song of Norway". They were last together in January 1969 for the filming of Love You till Tuesday, a 30-minute film that was not released until 1984: intended as a promotional vehicle, it featured performances from Bowie's repertoire, including "Space Oddity", which had not been released when the film was made.

Family

Bowie married his first wife, Mary Angela Barnett, on 19 March 1970 at Bromley Register Office in Bromley, London. They had an open marriage. Angela described their union as a marriage of convenience. "We got married so that I could [get a permit to] work. I didn't think it would last and David said, before we got married, 'I'm not really in love with you' and I thought that's probably a good thing", she said. Bowie said about Angela that "living with her is like living with a blow torch." Their son Duncan, born on 30 May 1971, was at first known as Zowie. Bowie and Angela divorced on 8 February 1980 in Switzerland. Bowie received custody of their son. After the gag order that was part of their divorce agreement ended, Angela wrote Backstage Passes: Life on the Wild Side with David Bowie, a memoir of their turbulent marriage.

On 24 April 1992, Bowie married Somali-American model Iman in a private ceremony in Lausanne. The wedding was later solemnised on 6 June in Florence. The couple's marriage influenced the content of Bowie's 1993 album Black Tie White Noise, particularly on tracks such as "The Wedding"/"The Wedding Song" and "Miracle Goodnight". They had one daughter, Alexandria "Lexi" Zahra Jones, born in August 2000. The couple resided primarily in New York City and London as well as owning an apartment in Sydney's Elizabeth Bay and Britannia Bay House on the island of Mustique.

Sexuality
Bowie declared himself gay in an interview with Michael Watts for a 1972 issue of Melody Maker, coinciding with his campaign for stardom as Ziggy Stardust. According to Buckley, "If Ziggy confused both his creator and his audience, a big part of that confusion centred on the topic of sexuality." In a September 1976 interview with Playboy, however, Bowie said: "It's true—I am a bisexual. But I can't deny that I've used that fact very well. I suppose it's the best thing that ever happened to me." His first wife, Angie, supported his claim of bisexuality and alleged that Bowie had a relationship with Mick Jagger.

In a 1983 interview with Rolling Stone, Bowie said his public declaration of bisexuality was "the biggest mistake I ever made" and "I was always a closet heterosexual." On other occasions, he said his interest in homosexual and bisexual culture had been more a product of the times and the situation in which he found himself than of his own feelings.

Blender asked Bowie in 2002 whether he still believed his public declaration was his biggest mistake. After a long pause, he said, "I don't think it was a mistake in Europe, but it was a lot tougher in America. I had no problem with people knowing I was bisexual. But I had no inclination to hold any banners nor be a representative of any group of people." Bowie said he wanted to be a songwriter and performer rather than a headline for his bisexuality, and in "puritanical" America, "I think it stood in the way of so much I wanted to do."

Buckley wrote that Bowie "mined sexual intrigue for its ability to shock." Sandford said, according to Mary Finnigan—with whom Bowie had an affair in 1969—Bowie and his first wife Angie "created their bisexual fantasy". He wrote that Bowie "made a positive fetish of repeating the quip that he and his wife had met while 'fucking the same bloke' ... Gay sex was always an anecdotal and laughing matter." The BBC's Mark Easton wrote in 2016 that Britain was "far more tolerant of difference", and that gay rights (such as same-sex marriage) and gender equality would not have "enjoyed the broad support they do today without Bowie's androgynous challenge all those years ago".

Spirituality and religion
Over the years, Bowie made numerous references to religions and to his evolving spirituality. Beginning in 1967 from the influence of his brother, he became interested in Buddhism and, with commercial success eluding him, he considered becoming a Buddhist monk. Biographer Marc Spitz states that the religion reminded the young artist that other goals in life existed outside fame and material gain and one can learn about themselves through meditation and chanting. After a few months' study at Tibet House in London, he was told by his Lama, Chime Rinpoche, "You don't want to be Buddhist.... You should follow music." By 1975, Bowie admitted, "I felt totally, absolutely alone. And I probably was alone because I pretty much had abandoned God." In his will, Bowie stipulated that he be cremated and his ashes scattered in Bali "in accordance with the Buddhist rituals".

After Bowie married Iman in a private ceremony in 1992, he said they knew that their "real marriage, sanctified by God, had to happen in a church in Florence". Earlier that year, he knelt on stage at The Freddie Mercury Tribute Concert and recited the Lord's Prayer before a television audience. In 1993, Bowie said he had an "undying" belief in the "unquestionable" existence of God. In a separate 1993 interview, while describing the genesis of the music for his album Black Tie White Noise, he said " … it was important for me to find something [musically] that also had no sort of representation of institutionalized and organized religion, of which I'm not a believer, I must make that clear." Interviewed in 2005, Bowie said whether God exists "is not a question that can be answered.... I'm not quite an atheist and it worries me. There's that little bit that holds on: 'Well, I'm almost an atheist. Give me a couple of months.... I've nearly got it right. He had a tattoo of the Serenity Prayer in Japanese on his left calf.

"Questioning [his] spiritual life [was] always ... germane" to Bowie's songwriting. The song "Station to Station" is "very much concerned with the Stations of the Cross"; the song also specifically references Kabbalah. Bowie called the album "extremely dark... the nearest album to a magick treatise that I've written". Earthling showed "the abiding need in me to vacillate between atheism or a kind of gnosticism... What I need is to find a balance, spiritually, with the way I live and my demise." Released shortly before his death, "Lazarus"—from his final album, Blackstar—began with the words, "Look up here, I'm in Heaven" while the rest of the album deals with other matters of mysticism and mortality.

Politics
As a seventeen-year-old still known as Davy Jones, he was a cofounder and spokesman for the Society for the Prevention of Cruelty to Long-Haired Men in response to members of The Manish Boys being asked to cut their hair prior to a television appearance on the BBC. He and his bandmates were interviewed on the network's 12 November 1964 instalment of Tonight to champion their cause. He stated on the programme, "I think we all like long hair and we don't see why other people should persecute us because of it."

In 1976, speaking as the Thin White Duke persona and "at least partially tongue-in-cheek", he made statements that expressed support for fascism and perceived admiration for Adolf Hitler in interviews with Playboy, NME, and a Swedish publication. Bowie was quoted as saying: "Britain is ready for a fascist leader ... I think Britain could benefit from a fascist leader. After all, fascism is really nationalism... I believe very strongly in fascism, people have always responded with greater efficiency under a regimental leadership." He was also quoted as saying: "Adolf Hitler was one of the first rock stars" and "You've got to have an extreme right front come up and sweep everything off its feet and tidy everything up." Bowie later retracted these comments in an interview with Melody Maker in October 1977, blaming them on mental instability caused by his drug problems at the time, saying: "I was out of my mind, totally, completely crazed." In the same interview, Bowie described himself as "apolitical", stating "The more I travel and the less sure I am about exactly which political philosophies are commendable. The more government systems I see, the less enticed I am to give my allegiance to any set of people, so it would be disastrous for me to adopt a definitive point of view, or to adopt a party of people and say 'these are my people'."

In the 1980s and 1990s, Bowie's public statements shifted sharply towards anti-racism and anti-fascism. In an interview with MTV anchor Mark Goodman in 1983, Bowie criticised the channel for not providing enough coverage of Black musicians, becoming visibly uncomfortable when Goodman suggested that the network's fear of backlash from the American Midwest was one reason for such a lack of coverage. The music videos for "China Girl" and "Let's Dance" were described by Bowie as a "very simple, very direct" statement against racism. The album Tin Machine took a more direct stance against fascism and neo-Nazism, and was criticised for being too preachy.

At the 2014 Brit Awards on 19 February, Bowie became the oldest recipient of a Brit Award in the ceremony's history when he won the award for British Male Solo Artist, which was collected on his behalf by Kate Moss. His speech read: "I'm completely delighted to have a Brit for being the best male – but I am, aren't I Kate? Yes. I think it's a great way to end the day. Thank you very, very much and Scotland stay with us." Bowie's reference to the forthcoming September 2014 Scottish independence referendum garnered a significant reaction throughout the UK on social media.

In 2016, filmmaker and activist Michael Moore said he had wanted to use "Panic in Detroit" for his 1998 documentary The Big One. Denied at first, Moore was given the rights after calling Bowie personally, recalling: "I've read stuff since his death saying that he wasn't that political and he stayed away from politics. But that wasn't the conversation that I had with him."

Philanthropy
Bowie was involved in philanthropic and charitable efforts for HIV/AIDS research in Africa, as well as other humanitarian projects helping disadvantaged children and developing nations, ending poverty and hunger, promoting human rights, and providing education and health care to children affected by war. A portion of the proceeds from the Pay-per-view showing of Bowie's 50th birthday party in 1997 was donated to the Save the Children charity.

Death

On 10 January 2016, Bowie died of liver cancer in his New York City apartment. He had been diagnosed 18 months earlier but had not made his condition public. The Belgian theatre director Ivo van Hove, who had worked with Bowie on his off-Broadway musical Lazarus, explained that he was unable to attend rehearsals due to the progression of the disease. He noted that Bowie had kept working during the illness.

Visconti wrote:

Following Bowie's death, fans gathered at impromptu street shrines. At the mural of Bowie in his birthplace of Brixton, south London, which shows him in his Aladdin Sane character, fans laid flowers and sang his songs. Other memorial sites included Berlin, Los Angeles, and outside his apartment in New York. After news of his death, sales of his albums and singles soared. Bowie had insisted that he did not want a funeral, and according to his death certificate he was cremated in New Jersey on 12 January. As he wished in his will, his ashes were scattered in a Buddhist ceremony in Bali, Indonesia.

Posthumous releases
In September 2016, a box set Who Can I Be Now? (1974–1976) was released covering Bowie's mid-1970s soul period; it included The Gouster, a previously unreleased 1974 album. An EP, No Plan, was released on 8 January 2017, which would have been Bowie's 70th birthday. Apart from "Lazarus", the EP includes three songs that Bowie recorded during the Blackstar sessions, but were left off the album and appeared on the soundtrack album for the Lazarus musical in October 2016. A music video for the title track was also released. 2017 and 2018 also saw the release of a series of posthumous live albums, covering the Diamond Dogs tour of 1974, the Isolar tour of 1976 and the Isolar II tour of 1978. In the two years following his death, Bowie sold 5 million records in the UK alone. In their top 10 list for the Global Recording Artist of the Year, the International Federation of the Phonographic Industry named Bowie the second-bestselling artist worldwide in 2016, behind Drake.

At the 59th Annual Grammy Awards in 2017, Bowie won all five nominated awards: Best Rock Performance; Best Alternative Music Album; Best Engineered Album, Non-Classical; Best Recording Package; and Best Rock Song. They were Bowie's first Grammy wins in musical categories. On 8 January 2020, on what would have been Bowie's 73rd birthday, a previously unreleased version of "The Man Who Sold the World" was released and two releases were announced: a streaming-only EP, Is It Any Wonder?, and an album, ChangesNowBowie, released in November 2020 for Record Store Day. In August 2020, another series of live shows were released, including sets from Dallas in 1995 and Paris in 1999. These and other shows, part of a series of live concerts spanning his tours from 1995 to 1999, was released in late 2020 and early 2021 as part of the box set Brilliant Live Adventures. In September 2021, Bowie's estate signed a distribution deal with Warner Music Group, beginning in 2023, covering Bowie's recordings from 2000 through 2016. Bowie's album Toy, recorded in 2001, was released on what would have been Bowie's 75th birthday. On 3 January 2022, Variety reported that Bowie's estate had sold his publishing catalogue to Warner Chappell Music, "for a price upwards of $250 million".

Awards and achievements

Bowie's 1969 commercial breakthrough, the song "Space Oddity", won him an Ivor Novello Special Award For Originality. For his performance in the 1976 science fiction film The Man Who Fell to Earth, he won the Saturn Award for Best Actor. In the ensuing decades he was honoured with numerous awards for his music and its accompanying videos, receiving, among others, six Grammy Awards and four Brit Awards—winning Best British Male Artist twice; the award for Outstanding Contribution to Music in 1996; and the Brits Icon award for his "lasting impact on British culture", given posthumously in 2016.

In 1999, Bowie was made a Commander of the Ordre des Arts et des Lettres by the French government. He received an honorary doctorate from Berklee College of Music the same year. He declined the royal honour of Commander of the Order of the British Empire (CBE) in 2000, and turned down a knighthood in 2003. Bowie later stated "I would never have any intention of accepting anything like that. I seriously don't know what it's for. It's not what I spent my life working for."

During his lifetime, Bowie sold over 100 million records worldwide, making him one of the best-selling music artists. In the United Kingdom, he was awarded 9 platinum, 11 gold, and 8 silver albums, and in the United States, 5 platinum and 9 gold. Since 2015, Parlophone has remastered Bowie's back catalogue through the "Era" box set series, starting with Five Years (1969–1973). Bowie was announced as the best-selling vinyl artist of the 21st century in 2022.

Rolling Stones 500 Greatest Albums of All Time list includes The Rise and Fall of Ziggy Stardust and the Spiders from Mars at number 40, Station to Station at number 52, Hunky Dory at number 88, Low at number 206, and Scary Monsters (and Super Creeps) at number 443. And, on their 500 Greatest Songs of All Time list, Rolling Stone includes "Heroes" at number 23, "Life on Mars?" at number 105, "Space Oddity" at number 189, "Changes" at number 200, "Young Americans" at number 204, "Station to Station" at number 400, and "Under Pressure" at number 429. Four of his songs are included in The Rock and Roll Hall of Fame's 500 Songs that Shaped Rock and Roll.

In the BBC's 2002 poll of the 100 Greatest Britons, Bowie was ranked 29. In 2004, Rolling Stone magazine ranked him 39th on their list of the 100 Greatest Artists of All Time. Bowie was inducted into the Rock and Roll Hall of Fame in 1996 and into the Songwriters Hall of Fame in 2005. He was inducted into the Science Fiction and Fantasy Hall of Fame in 2013. Days after Bowie's death, Rolling Stone contributor Rob Sheffield proclaimed him "the greatest rock star ever". The magazine also listed him as the 39th greatest songwriter of all time. In 2022, Sky Arts ranked him the most influential artist in Britain of the last 50 years: "Bowie’s influence transcends genres, through picks with cut-out designs of music, art, stage and screen." He ranked 32nd on the 2023 Rolling Stone list of the 200 Greatest Singers of All Time. 

In 2008, the spider Heteropoda davidbowie was named in Bowie's honour. In 2011, his image was chosen by popular vote for the B£10m note of the local currency of his birthplace, the Brixton Pound. On 5 January 2015, a main-belt asteroid was named 342843 Davidbowie. On 13 January 2016, Belgian amateur astronomers at MIRA Public Observatory created a "Bowie asterism" of seven stars which had been in the vicinity of Mars at the time of Bowie's death; the "constellation" forms the lightning bolt on Bowie's face from the cover of his Aladdin Sane album. In March 2017, Bowie featured on a series of UK postage stamps issued by the Royal Mail. On 25 March 2018, a statue of Bowie was unveiled in Aylesbury, Buckinghamshire, the town where he debuted Ziggy Stardust. The statue features a likeness of Bowie in 2002 accompanied with various characters and looks from over his career, with Ziggy Stardust at the front. In 2022, Sky Arts ranked him the most influential artist in Britain of the last 50 years: "Bowie’s influence transcends genres, through picks with cut-out designs of music, art, stage and screen."

Discography

 David Bowie (1967)
 David Bowie (1969)
 The Man Who Sold the World (1970)
 Hunky Dory (1971)
 The Rise and Fall of Ziggy Stardust and the Spiders from Mars (1972)
 Aladdin Sane (1973)
 Pin Ups (1973)
 Diamond Dogs (1974)
 Young Americans (1975)
 Station to Station (1976)
 Low (1977)
 "Heroes" (1977)
 Lodger (1979)
 Scary Monsters (and Super Creeps) (1980)
 Let's Dance (1983)
 Tonight (1984)
 Never Let Me Down (1987)
 Black Tie White Noise (1993)
 The Buddha of Suburbia (1993)
 Outside (1995)
 Earthling (1997)
 Hours (1999)
 Heathen (2002)
 Reality (2003)
 The Next Day (2013)
 Blackstar (2016)

See also
 List of ambient music artists
 List of artists who reached number one in the United States
 List of artists who reached number one on the US Dance Club Songs chart
 List of Billboard number-one Dance Club songs
 List of Billboard number-one singles

Explanatory notes

References

Citations

Bibliography

Further reading

 
 
 
 
 
 
 
 
 
 
 
 
 Waldrep, Shelton, "Phenomenology of Performance", The Aesthetics of Self-Invention: Oscar Wilde to David Bowie, University of Minnesota Press, 2004.

External links

 
 
 
 
 
 
 

 
1947 births
2016 deaths
20th-century English male actors
20th-century English male singers
20th-century English LGBT people
21st-century art collectors
21st-century English male singers
21st-century English LGBT people
Androgynous people
Art pop musicians
Art rock musicians
Bertelsmann Music Group artists
Bisexual men
Bisexual singers
Brit Award winners
British harmonica players
British male saxophonists
British mimes
Burials in Indonesia
Columbia Records artists
Commandeurs of the Ordre des Arts et des Lettres
Deaths from cancer in New York (state)
Deaths from liver cancer
Decca Records artists
Deram Records artists
EMI Records artists
English art collectors
English baritones
English electronic musicians
English expatriates in Germany
English expatriates in Switzerland
English expatriates in the United States
English experimental musicians
English male guitarists
English male film actors
English male singer-songwriters
English multi-instrumentalists
English people of Irish descent
English people of Welsh descent
English philanthropists
English pop singers
English record producers
English rock saxophonists
English rock singers
English soul singers
Experimental pop musicians
Glam rock musicians
Grammy Lifetime Achievement Award winners
Hansa Records artists
Ivor Novello Award winners
English LGBT singers
English LGBT songwriters
Bisexual songwriters
Male actors from London
Male new wave singers
Mercury Records artists
Parlophone artists
People from Brixton
Philips Records artists
Protopunk musicians
Pye Records artists
RCA Records artists
Rykodisc artists
Science Fiction Hall of Fame inductees
Singers from London
Synth-pop singers
The Hype (band) members
The Spiders from Mars members
Tin Machine members
Virgin Records artists
Vocalion Records artists